Twelve venues (seven new and five renovated) in twelve Brazilian cities were selected for the 2014 FIFA World Cup. The cities also housed the 32 teams and fan-zones for spectators without tickets for the stations. Around 3 million tickets were put on sale of which most were sold out in a day. Eighteen locations were presented as potential host cities with the twelve successful candidates announced on 31 May 2009: Belém, Campo Grande, Florianópolis, Goiânia and Rio Branco were rejected, while Maceió had already withdrawn in January 2009.

FIFA proposed that no more than one city could use two stadiums, and the number of host cities was limited between eight and ten. However, FIFA subsequently accepted the Brazilian Football Confederation's suggestion to use twelve host cities in "the interest of the whole country". The twelve selections – each the capital of its state – covered all the main regions of Brazil and created more evenly distributed hosting than the 1950 finals in Brazil provided, when matches were concentrated in the south-east and south. Consequently, the tournament required significant long-distance travel for teams. Statistics show that nearly 10 million passengers used around 20 Brazilian airports in 31 days of the tournament.

Stadiums
The 64 matches were staged at the following 12 stadiums:

Construction

Teams' stay
Base camps were used by the 32 national squads to stay and train before and during the tournament. On 31 January 2014, FIFA announced the base camps for each participating team. The table below shows base camps and venues for each team.

FIFA Fan Fests

For a third consecutive World Cup tournament, FIFA announced they would be holding FIFA Fan Fests in each of the twelve host cities. Prominent examples are the Copacabana Beach in Rio de Janeiro, which had already held a Fan Fest in 2010, São Paulo's Vale do Anhangabaú and Brasília's Esplanada dos Ministérios, with the Congress in the background. The official "kick-off event" for the 2014 Fan Fest took place on Iracema Beach, in Fortaleza, on Sunday, July 8, 2014, according to FIFA's official website.

Locations

 Rio de Janeiro – Praia de Copacabana (Copacabana Beach)
 São Paulo – Vale do Anhangabaú (Anhangabaú Valley)
 Brasília – Taguaparque (Taguatinga)
 Belo Horizonte – Expominas (Expominas Expositions Centre)
 Cuiabá – Parque de Exposições (Expositions Park)
 Curitiba – Pedreira Paulo Leminski (Paulo Leminski Quarry)
 Fortaleza – Praia de Iracema (Iracema Beach)
 Manaus – Praia Ponta Negra (Black Beach)
 Natal – Praia do Forte (Fort Beach)
 Porto Alegre – Anfiteatro Pôr-do-Sol (Sunset Amphitheatre)
 Recife – Cais da Alfândega (Customhouse Wharf)
 Salvador – Farol da Barra (Barra Lighthouse)

Statistics

References

Venues